Ægir (also Æger) is a figure in Norse mythology.

Aegir, AEgir, Ægir or Æger may also refer to:

Science
Aegir (moon), a moon of Saturn
AEgir (planet) or Epsilon Eridani b, an exoplanet
Aegir, another name for a tidal bore
Trent Aegir, the tidal bore on the River Trent
Aegir Ridge, an extinct mid-ocean ridge in the far-northern Atlantic Ocean
Aegir, another name for aegirine, a type of silicate mineral
Aeger, a genus of fossil shrimp

Ships
Ægir-class offshore patrol vessel, a class serving the Icelandic Coast Guard
, a former class of ships in the US Navy
DCV Aegir, a 2013 large offshore construction vessel being built for Heerema Marine Contractors
, name of several ships in the Royal Norwegian Navy
ICGV Ægir, offshore patrol vessel of the Icelandic Coast Guard
, coastal defense ships of the Imperial German Navy
, a 1943 former US submarine tender

Other uses
G.S.R. Aegir, a student rowing club in Groningen, the Netherlands 
Aegir, the name of a member of the Asgard race in the science fiction TV show Stargate

See also
Agir (disambiguation)
Ager (disambiguation)